Sean Godsell (born 9 September 1960) is an Australian architect.

Biography
Godsell was born in Melbourne, Australia, the son of David Godsell, also an architect. In his early years he lived in Beaumaris and attended Kostka Hall a preparatory school to Xavier College where he completed his secondary education. He later studied at the University of Melbourne, graduating in 1984. He also undertook postgraduate study at RMIT. From 1986 to 1988 he worked in the London office of Sir Denys Lasdun, returning to Australia in 1989.
In 1994, 

In 1980 and 1981, Godsell played for St Kilda in the Victorian Football League. He made two VFL appearance and kicked two goals.

His work has been published in the world's leading Architectural journals including Architectural Review (UK) Architectural Record (USA) Domus (Italy) A+U (Japan) Casabella (Italy) GA Houses (Japan) Detail (Germany) Le Moniteur (France) and Architect (Portugal).
  
In July 2002 the influential English design magazine wallpaper listed him as one of ten people destined to 'change the way we live'. He was the only Australian and the only Architect in the group.

He has lectured in the US, UK, China, Japan, India, France, Italy and New Zealand as well as across Australia. He was a keynote speaker at the Alvar Aalto symposium in Finland in July 2006.

In July 2003 he received a Citation from the President of the American Institute of Architects for his work for the homeless. His Future Shack prototype was exhibited from May to October 2004 at the Smithsonian Institution's Cooper Hewitt Design Museum in New York. In the same year the Italian publisher Electa published the monograph Sean Godsell: Works and Projects. Time Magazine named him in the 'Who's Who -The New Contemporaries' section of their 2005 Style and Design supplement. He was the only Australian and the only Architect in the group of seven eminent designers.

In July 2013 he was visiting professor at Iuav University of Venice and delivered the UNESCO chair open lecture in Mantova, Italy.

Selected projects
 Kew House (1996–97)
 St Andrews Beach House (2007)
 RMIT Design Hub (2012)

Awards
He has received numerous local and international awards. In 2006 he received the Victorian Premier's Design Award and the RAIA Robin Boyd Award and in 2007 he received the Cappochin residential architecture award in Italy and a Chicago Athenaeum award in the USA – all for St Andrew's Beach House. In 2008 he was recipient of his second AIA Record Houses Award for Excellence in the US for Glenburn House. In 2008 architectural historian Kenneth Frampton nominated him for the inaugural BSI Swiss Architecture Award for architects under the age of 50 and his work was exhibited as part of the Milan Triennale and Venice Biennale in the same year. In 2010 the prototype of the RMIT Design Hub façade was exhibited in Gallery MA in Tokyo before being transported in 2011 to its permanent home at the Victoria and Albert Museum in London. In 2012 he was shortlisted to design the new Australian Pavilion in Venice. In 2013 he received the RAIA Victorian Medal and William Wardell Awards for the RMIT Design Hub and the Harold Desbrowe Annear award for the Edward St House.
The Australian Institute of Architects has awarded its highest honour - the Gold Medal - to “master craftsman” Sean Godsell. At the 2022 National Prizes announcement, the jury commended Godsell’s body of work, describing it as demonstrating “an extraordinary commitment to excellence in design, detail and resolution.”AIA

References

Further reading
 
 El Croquis (2013) Sean Godsell – Tough Subtlety, includes an essay by Juhani Pallasmaa and interview by Leon Van Schaik.

External links
National Design Museum, New York, May 2004
Sean Godsell.com

1960 births
Living people
Architects from Melbourne
St Kilda Football Club players
University of Melbourne alumni
RMIT University alumni
Australian rules footballers from Melbourne
Old Xaverians Football Club players
People educated at Xavier College
People from Beaumaris, Victoria
20th-century Australian architects
21st-century Australian architects